Jack Duffy (born September 25, 1970) is an American ice hockey coach and former defenseman who was an All-American for Yale.

Career
Duffy began attending Yale University in the fall of 1989, joining a program that had slowly improving over the course of the 1980s. Duffy was not a big scorer for the Bulldogs, but he was instrumental in getting Yale's defense to allow fewer goals in each of his four seasons. He was able to help Yale to a winning record as a junior while producing at a point per game pace. he was named team captain for his senior season and, while the results were still positive, the team stalled a bit and wasn't able to build on their modest success. Duffy was named an All-American and began his professional career the following year.

Duffy split time between leagues in 1994 but was impressive enough to find himself in the IHL for the entirety of 1994–95. He played one more year at that level before deciding to retire as a player. He immediately turned to coaching, returning to Connecticut to work with the Greenwich Skating Club, but took several years off after starting a family. When his daughter Hayley began playing hockey, he returned to coaching. Duffy was the assistant coach of the boys hockey team at Greenwich High School for two seasons. In July 2020, head coach Chris Rurak died suddenly at the age of 47. A few months later, Duffy agreed to take over as head coach.

Statistics

Regular season and playoffs

Awards and honors

References

External links

1969 births
Living people
Ice hockey coaches from Connecticut
People from North Branford, Connecticut
American men's ice hockey defensemen
Yale Bulldogs men's ice hockey players
AHCA Division I men's ice hockey All-Americans
Knoxville Cherokees players
Las Vegas Thunder players
Chicago Wolves players
New York Islanders draft picks
National Hockey League supplemental draft picks
Ice hockey players from Connecticut